The forty-fourth season of the NBC comedy series Saturday Night Live premiered on September 29, 2018, during the 2018–19 television season with host Adam Driver and musical guest Kanye West and concluded on May 18, 2019, with host Paul Rudd and musical guest DJ Khaled.

Cast
Prior to the start of the season, Luke Null (who joined the cast for the previous season) was let go from the show. Upright Citizens Brigade alum Ego Nwodim joined the cast as a featured player, replacing Null. Nwodim became the seventh African-American female cast member in the show's history. Mikey Day, Alex Moffat, and Melissa Villaseñor, all three of whom were hired in 2016 for season 42, were upgraded to repertory status, while Heidi Gardner and Chris Redd, both of whom were hired in 2017 for season 43, remained as featured players. 

Aside from Null, all other cast members from the previous season returned to the show, including guest star Alec Baldwin in his role as President Donald Trump.

This would be the final season for Leslie Jones, who had been with the cast for five seasons since 2014. Jones announced her departure on August 27, 2019, in favor of focusing on her movie career.

Cast roster

Repertory players
 Beck Bennett
 Aidy Bryant
 Michael Che
 Pete Davidson
 Mikey Day
 Leslie Jones
 Colin Jost
 Kate McKinnon
 Alex Moffat
 Kyle Mooney
 Cecily Strong
 Kenan Thompson
 Melissa Villaseñor

Featured players
 Heidi Gardner
 Ego Nwodim
 Chris Redd

bold denotes "Weekend Update" anchor

Writers

Prior to the start of the season, the show added Alison Gates, Alan Linic, Eli Mandel, and Bowen Yang to the writing staff, while co-head writer Bryan Tucker was designated a senior writer, leaving Colin Jost, Michael Che, and Kent Sublette as the show's remaining head writers. This was the final season for Katie Rich, who had previously been a writer on the show since 2013.

Episodes

Notes

References

44
Saturday Night Live in the 2010s
2018 American television seasons
2019 American television seasons
Television shows directed by Don Roy King